Nora Bossong (born 9 January 1982) is a German writer. She lives in Berlin.

Career
Bossong studied literature at the German Institute for Literature, as well as cultural studies, philosophy and comparative literature at the Humboldt University of Berlin, the University of Potsdam, and the Sapienza University of Rome. She was a 2001 Fellow of the first Wolfenbüttel literature laboratory. 

Bossong's poetry and prose have been published in individual newspapers, anthologies and literary journals. In 2006, she published her debut novel. In 2022, she published a non-fiction book about her generation, Die Geschmeidigen: Meine Generation und der neue Ernst des Lebens (The Smooth Ones: My generation and life's new seriousness). 

An advocate for democracy, peace and human rights, Bossong was also a member of the presidium of the PEN Centre Germany for two years.

Awards 

 2001 – Young Authors meeting winner
 2001 – Bremer Author scholarship
 2003 – Klagenfurt Literature Course
 2004 – Leipzig Literature Scholarship
 2005 – prose fellowship from the Jürgen Ponto Foundation
 2007 – Wolfgang Weyrauch Prize
 2007 – Berlin Senate Scholarship
 2008 – New York Fellowship in the German House
 2010 – Scholarship from the Heinrich-Heine House of Lüneburg
 2011 – Berliner Kunstpreis, the Academy of Arts Berlin
 2012 – Peter-Huchel-Preis for Sommer vor den Mauern
 2017 – Roswitha Prize
 2019 – Kranichsteiner Literaturpreis for Gesellschaft mit beschränkter Haftung
 2020 – Thomas Mann Prize

Publications 

Gegend: Roman, (Area), novel, Frankfurter Verlagsanstalt, 2006, .
Reglose Jagd: Gedichte (Motionless hunting), poems, .
Location (audio CD), Munich-Spring-Verlag, München 2009.
Webers Protokoll (Weber's protocol), novel, Frankfurter Verlagsanstalt, 2009, .
Sommer vor den Mauern: Gedichte, (Summer before the walls), poetry, Carl Hanser Verlag, Munich 2011, .
Gesellschaft mit beschränkter Haftung (Limited liability company), novel, Hanser, Munich 2012, .

References

External links
"10 Fragen an", Goethe Institut, Juli 2011

1982 births
Living people
Writers from Bremen
German women poets
21st-century German novelists
German women novelists
Humboldt University of Berlin alumni
University of Potsdam alumni
Sapienza University of Rome alumni
21st-century German poets
21st-century German women writers